Victor Lindman (born August 15, 1995) is a Swedish ice hockey defenceman. He is currently playing with Linköpings HC of the Swedish Hockey League (SHL).

Lindman made his Swedish Hockey League debut playing with Linköpings HC during the 2013–14 SHL playoffs.

References

External links

1995 births
Living people
Linköping HC players
Swedish ice hockey defencemen